Fuchsia pilaloensis is a species of plant in the family Onagraceae. It is endemic to Ecuador.

References

pilaloensis
Endemic flora of Ecuador
Vulnerable plants
Taxonomy articles created by Polbot